Konno (written: 金野, 今野 or 紺野) is a Japanese surname. Notable people with the surname include:

, Japanese footballer
, Japanese ski jumper
, Japanese idol and singer
, Japanese politician
Ford Konno (born 1933), American swimmer
, Japanese video game designer
, Japanese voice actress
, Japanese basketball player
, Japanese judoka
, Japanese voice actor
, Japanese actress
Mari Konno (born 1980), Japanese basketball player
, Japanese actress and essayist
, Japanese rugby union player
, Japanese table tennis player
, Japanese footballer
, Japanese women's footballer

Fictional characters
, the main character of the anime film The Girl Who Leapt Through Time
, one of the main characters of the anime series Zombie Land Saga

See also
Konno Station, a railway station in Gifu Prefecture, Japan

Japanese-language surnames